The 15th Madras Native Infantry can refer to the:

89th Punjabis which was the 1st Battalion, 15th Madras Native Infantry in 1798
90th Punjabis which was the 2nd Battalion, 15th Madras Native Infantry in 1798
75th Carnatic Infantry which was called the 15th Madras Native Infantry in 1824